Phantom Planet may refer to:

Phantom Planet, an American rock band
Phantom Planet (album), the band's third album, released in 2004
The Phantom Planet, a 1961 science fiction film
"Phantom Planet," the series finale of the Nickelodeon animated television series Danny Phantom